Universitetshuset may refer to the following university buildings in Sweden:
 Universitetshuset at Uppsala University, see University Hall (Uppsala University)
 Universitetshuset at Lund University, see Lund University Main Building
 The main building of Umeå University